The Hopman Cup XI (also known as the Hyundai Hopman Cup for sponsorship reasons) was an Australian tennis tournament played at the Burswood Entertainment Complex located in Perth. Australia's Jelena Dokić and Mark Philippoussis of Australia won, defeating Sweden's Åsa Carlsson and Jonas Björkman in the final.

Team participation
 – Jelena Dokić and Mark Philippoussis
 – Sandrine Testud and Guillaume Raoux
 – Karina Habšudová and Karol Kučera
 – Amanda Coetzer and Wayne Ferreira
 – Arantxa Sánchez Vicario and Carlos Moyà
 – Åsa Carlsson and Jonas Björkman
 – Martina Hingis and Ivo Heuberger
 – Lindsay Davenport and Jan-Michael Gambill
1 – Cara Black and Wayne Black

1Zimbabwe lost in qualifying to France, but then took the place of Spain in the South Africa-Spain series of matches.

Play-off

France vs. Zimbabwe

Group A

Teams and standings

Australia vs. France

Australia vs. South Africa

Australia vs. Spain

France vs. South Africa

France vs. Spain

South Africa vs. Zimbabwe for Spain
Zimbabwe had to replace Spain in this series of matches.

Group B

Teams and standings

Sweden vs. Slovakia

Slovakia vs. Switzerland

Slovakia vs. United States

Sweden vs. Switzerland

Sweden vs. United States

Switzerland vs. United States

Final

External links

Hopman Cups by year
Hopman Cup
Hopman Cup
1990s in Perth, Western Australia